Methodist Church Concord (Woods Methodist Church) is a historic church near Carthage, Texas.

It was built in 1876 and added to the National Register in 1980.

See also

National Register of Historic Places listings in Panola County, Texas
Recorded Texas Historic Landmarks in Panola County

References

Methodist churches in Texas
Churches on the National Register of Historic Places in Texas
Churches completed in 1876
19th-century Methodist church buildings in the United States
Buildings and structures in Panola County, Texas
National Register of Historic Places in Panola County, Texas